Lee Gi-seong (born 1966) is a South Korean poet. She was born in Seoul and earned her bachelors and master's from Ewha Womans University in Korean Literature. She is currently working as a lecturer at her alma mater. She is praised as a modernist poet who uniquely expresses the inner anxiety of modern society. She received the Hyundae Literary Award in 2015.

Education
She received a doctorate degree for her paper on modernist poetry, and her own poetry is also described as belonging to modernism.

Life 
Lee's career started in 1998 when she published the poems "" (지하도 입구에서 At the Entrance of the Underground Passage), "" (우포늪 Upo Marsh), and "" (아무도 보지 못한 풍경 A Scene Nobody Has Seen) in Literature and Society, as well as a critical essay in 2001 in 21st Century Literature. Currently, she is a lecturer at Ewha Womans University. Her poetry was also published in the poetry journal Po&sie's special issue on Korean poets.

Writing 
From the time of her debut, Lee Gi-seong was praised as ‘a poet that had carved out a territory of her own with thoroughly detailed description of the ruinous aspect of life’. As such, she dramatically transcribes the tragic parts of life. She persistently captures the scenes of devastation in life, and describes them in her own language. This gives her work a fantastical, yet ordinary feeling. Kim Sa-in has stated that she has a perspective on life that ‘doesn't lose social acuteness, but also doesn't allow excessive passion to overrun her poetry, that she does not take lightly the individuality of her own voice and creative methods while still following her era, and that she maintains decency while possessing anger and sadness’.

In her first poetry collection  (불쑥 내민 손; Suddenly Given Hand), published in 2004, is a detailed record of life in a city marred by death and corruption. Also, this collection has painfully depicted the process of how a modern person becomes aware of the uncomfortable discord, loneliness, and desolation that unexpectedly arise from everyday life.

From then on, Lee Gi-seong has often used the method distorting her perspective on the objective world. Her second poetry collection,  (타일의 모든 것; Everything About Tiles), has developed such aspect of her poetry. Here, despite the poet having ‘unpleasant passion’ for facing against the gray reality, rather than literally describing that, she reveals her ‘reckless courage’ for finding another way.

Recently, with a more mature perspective, the poet describes the life of a modern person that lives as an anonymous being. In her poetry, those that are left in want show emotions such as depression, sadness, grief, and lethargy. However, she does not only mire in futility, but rather attempts to overcome such emotions through self-reflection and action. By reminding herself of the vitality of ‘language’ and ‘poetry’ in a corrupt world, she is exploring the possibility of new poetic potential.

Awards and honours

Works

Poetry collections 
  (불쑥 내민 손; Suddenly Given Hand), Munhakgwajiseongsa, 2004. 
  (타일의 모든 것; Everything About Tiles), Munhakgwajiseongsa, 2010. 
  (채식주의자의 식탁; The Table of a Vegetarian), Munhakgwajiseongsa, 2015.

Critical essays 
  (모더니즘의 심연을 건너는 시적 여정; A Poetic Journey Across Modernism's Inner Side), Somyeongchulpan, 2006.  
  (우리, 유쾌한 사전꾼들; We, the Happy Counterfeiters), Somyeongchulpan, 2009 
  (백지 위의 손; The Hand Above the Blank Paper), Kepoibooks, 2015.

Awards 
 2015, Hyundae Literary Award

References

Further reading 
 "Everything about Work, Tile, and Style," in Munhak and Society 24 volume 1 Munhakgwajiseongsa, 2011.

External links 
 Naver Cast

1966 births
Living people
20th-century South Korean poets
21st-century South Korean poets
South Korean women poets
21st-century South Korean women writers
20th-century South Korean women writers